Parliament House in Dublin, Ireland, was home to the Parliament of Ireland, and since 1803 has housed the Bank of Ireland. It was the world's first purpose-built bicameral parliament house. It is located at College Green.

History
Originally it was the site of Chichester House, which was built in the early 17th century by Sir Arthur Chichester. This building was adapted for use by the Irish Parliament in the 1670s, and was demolished to make way for a new parliamentary building. Chichester House was flanked by rows of narrow houses known as Dutch Billies, which were demolished and replaced during the Wide Streets Commission. Construction started in 1729. The building was home to the two Houses of Parliament, serving as the seat of both chambers (the Lords and Commons) of the Parliament of the Kingdom of Ireland for most of the 18th century until that parliament was abolished by the Act of Union of 1800, when Ireland became part of the United Kingdom of Great Britain and Ireland.

The current parliament building is Leinster House.

Plans for the new building

In the 17th century, parliament settled at Chichester House, a townhouse in Hoggen Green (later College Green) formerly owned by Sir George Carew, Lord President of Munster and Lord High Treasurer of Ireland, which had been built on the site of a nunnery disbanded by King Henry VIII at the time of the dissolution of the monasteries. Carew's house, named Chichester House after its later owner Sir Arthur Chichester, was a building of sufficient importance to have become the temporary home of the Kingdom of Ireland's law courts during the Michaelmas law term in 1605. Most famously, the legal documentation facilitating the Plantation of Ulster had been signed there on 16 November 1612.

Chichester House was in a dilapidated state, allegedly haunted and unfit for official use. In 1727 parliament voted to spend £6,000 on a new building on the site. It was to be the world's first purpose-built two-chamber parliament building.

The then ancient Palace of Westminster, the seat of the English (before 1707) and, later, British Parliament, was a converted building; the House of Commons's odd seating arrangements were due to the chamber's previous existence as a chapel. Hence MPs faced each other from former pews.

The design of this building, one of two purpose-built Irish parliamentary buildings (along with Parliament Buildings, Stormont), was entrusted to an architect, Edward Lovett Pearce, who was a member of parliament and a protégé of the Speaker of the House of Commons, William Conolly of Castletown House. During construction, Parliament moved into the Blue Coat Hospital on Dublin's Northside. The foundation stone for the new building was laid on 3February 1729 by Thomas Wyndham, 1st Baron Wyndham, the Lord Chancellor of Ireland.

Design

Pearce's design was revolutionary. The building was effectively semi-circular in shape, occupying nearly 6,000 m2 (1.5 acres). Unlike Chichester House, which was set far back from Hoggen Green, the new building opened directly onto the Green. The principal entrance consisted of a colonnade of Ionic columns extending around three sides of the entrance quadrangle, forming a letter E (see picture below). Three statues, representing Hibernia (the Latin name for Ireland), Fidelity and Commerce (later carved by Edward Smyth) stood above the portico. Over the main entrance, the royal coat of arms was cut in stone.

The building underwent extensions by architect James Gandon, as Pearce had died. Gandon was responsible for three of Dublin's finest buildings, the Custom House, the Four Courts and the King's Inns. Between 1785 and 1789 he added a new peers' entrance at the east of the building, facing onto Westmoreland Street. Unlike the main entrance to the south, which came to be known as the House of Commons entrance, the new peers' entrance used six Corinthian columns, at the request of peers who wished their entrance to be distinct from the Ionic columns of the main entrance. Over this, three statues by Edward Smyth were placed, representing Fortitude, Justice and Liberty. A curved wall joined the Pearce entrance to Gandon's extension. This masked the uneven joins of some of the extension, as shown below. The wall, built of granite with inset alcoves, bears little resemblance to the building as it was in its parliamentary days.

Another extension was added on the west side into Foster Place, designed in 1787 by architect Robert Parke; while matching Gandon's portico, he tried a different solution, linking the other portico to the main Pearce one by a set of Ionic pillars. The result proved unattractive. When the Bank of Ireland took over the building, it created an architectural unity by replacing this set of Ionic columns by a curved wall similar to Gandon's east wall. Ionic columns were then added to both curved walls, giving the extensions an architectural and visual unity that had been lacking and producing the building's ultimate exterior.

The interior contained one unusual and highly symbolic feature. While in many converted parliamentary buildings where both houses met in the same building, the houses were given equality or indeed the upper house was given a more prominent location within the building, in the new Irish Houses of Parliament the House of Commons was featured, with its octagonal parliamentary chamber located in the building's centre. The smaller House of Lords was given a lesser position nearby.

The original, domed House of Commons chamber was destroyed by fire in the 1790s, and a less elaborate new chamber, without a dome, was rebuilt in the same location and opened in 1796, four years before the Parliament's ultimate abolition.

Pearce's design copied

Pearce's designs came to be studied and copied both at home and abroad. The Viceregal Apartments in Dublin Castle imitated his top-lit corridors. The British Museum in Bloomsbury in London copied his colonnaded main entrance. His impact reached Washington, D.C., where Pearce's building, and in particular his octagonal House of Commons chamber, was studied as plans were made for the United States Capitol building. While the shape of the chamber was not replicated, some of its decorative motifs were, with the ceiling structure in the Old Senate Chamber and old House of Representatives chamber (now the Statuary Hall) bearing a striking resemblance to Pearce's ceiling in the House of Commons.

The uniqueness of the building, the quality of its workmanship and its central location in College Green, across from Trinity College Dublin, made it one of Dublin's most highly regarded structures.

Public ceremonies

Much of the public ceremonies mirrored those of the British Houses of Parliament. Sessions were formally opened by a Speech from the Throne by the Lord Lieutenant, who "used to sit, surrounded by more splendour than His Majesty on the throne of England". The Sovereign's official representative, when he sat on the Throne, sat beneath a canopy of crimson velvet.

As in the English and British parliaments, the House of Lords was presided over by the Lord Chancellor, who sat on the Woolsack, a large seat stuffed with wool, which was seen as a symbol of economic success and wealth. At the State Opening of Parliament, Members were summoned from the nearby House of Commons chamber by White Rod, (as opposed to Black Rod in Westminster).

In the Commons, business was presided over by the Speaker, who in the absence of a government chosen from and answerable to the Commons was the dominant parliamentary figure. Speaker Conolly remains today one of the most widely known figures ever to be produced by an Irish parliament, for his role in Parliament and for the wealth that allowed him to build one of Ireland's greatest Georgian houses, Castletown House.

Sessions of parliament drew many of the wealthiest of Ireland's Anglo-Irish Ascendancy to Dublin, particularly as sessions often coincided with the Irish Social Season, running from January to 17 March (St. Patrick's Day), when the Lord Lieutenant presided in state over state balls and drawing rooms in the Viceregal Apartments in Dublin Castle. Leading peers flocked to Dublin, where they lived in enormous and richly decorated townhouses, initially on the Northside of Dublin, later in new Georgian residences around Merrion Square and Fitzwilliam Square. Their presence in Dublin, along with large numbers of servants, provided a regular boost to the city's economy.

The abolition of Parliament in 1800 had a major economic impact. Within a decade, many of the finest mansions (including Leinster House, Powerscourt House, and Aldborough House) had been sold, often to government agencies. Though Parliament itself was based on the exclusion of the vast Irish Catholic majority in Ireland, many nationalist historians and writers blamed the absence of Parliament for Dublin's increased impoverishment, with many of the large mansions in areas like Henrietta Street sold to property developers and landlords who reduced them to tenements.

The draw of the Viceregal Court and its social season was no longer enough to encourage most Irish peers and their entourages to come to Dublin. Their absence, with all their collective spending, severely damaged the Dublin economy, which went into dramatic decline. By the 1830s and 1840s, nationalist leader Daniel O'Connell was leading demand for the Repeal of the Act of Union and the re-establishment of an Irish parliament in Dublin, only this time one to which Catholics could be elected, in contrast with the earlier Anglican-only assembly.

Abolition

In the last thirty years of the Irish parliament, a series of crises and reforms changed its role. In 1782, following agitation by major parliamentary figures, but most notably Henry Grattan, the severe restrictions such as Poynings' Law that effectively controlled the Irish Parliament's ability to control its own legislative agenda were removed, producing what was known as the Constitution of 1782. A little over a decade later, Roman Catholics, who were by far the demographic majority, were allowed to cast votes in elections to Parliament, though they were still barred from office. The crisis over the "madness" of King George III produced a major strain in Anglo-Irish relations, as the King's parliaments possessed the theoretical right to nominate a regent without the requirement that they choose the same person. However, they in fact chose The Prince of Wales, who served as The Prince Regent in both the Kingdom of Great Britain and the Kingdom of Ireland.

The British Government decided the entire relationship between Britain and Ireland should be changed, with the merger of both kingdoms and their parliaments. After one failed attempt, this finally was achieved, albeit with mass bribery of members of both Houses, who were awarded British and United Kingdom peerages and other "encouragements". In August 1800 Parliament held its last session in the Irish Houses of Parliament. On 1January 1801, the Kingdom of Ireland and its Parliament officially ceased to exist, with the new United Kingdom of Great Britain and Ireland coming into being, with a united parliament meeting in Westminster, to which Ireland sent approximately 100 members, while peers in the Peerage of Ireland had the constant right to elect a number of fellow Irish peers as representative peers to represent Ireland in the House of Lords, on the model already introduced for Scottish peers.

After 1800: Bank

Initially, the former Parliament House was used for a variety of purposes, including as a military garrison and as an art gallery. In 1803 the fledgling Bank of Ireland bought the building from the British Government for £40,000 for use as its headquarters. As a result, the chamber was broken up to form small offices and by a magnificent cash office. Architect Francis Johnston (then the most prominent architect working in Ireland) was employed to oversee the conversion. However, the House of Lords chamber survived almost unscathed. It was used as the bank's board room until the 1970s when the bank moved its headquarters. The chamber is now open to the public and is used for various public functions, including music recitals.

Continuing Symbolism

Some of the building's contents survived. The ceremonial mace of the House of Commons remained in the family of the last Speaker of the House of Commons, John Foster, MP. The Bank of Ireland bought the Mace at a sale in Christie's in London in 1937. The Chair of the Speaker of the House of Commons is now in the possession of the Royal Dublin Society, while a bench from the Commons is in the Royal Irish Academy. Two original tapestries remain in the House of Lords. Designed by Dutch landscape painter William Van der Hagen, and woven by John Van Beaver, dating from circa 1733, the tapestries are unique. One represents the "Battle of the Boyne" and the other the "Defence of Londonderry". Each tapestry has five portrait and narrative medallions around the central scene that depict, narrate and name central characters and events in the battles. Both also have "trophies of arms and figures of Fame below enclosed by fringed curtains". The chandelier of the House of Commons now hangs in the Examination Hall of Trinity College Dublin. The Woolsack, on which the Lord Chancellor of Ireland sat when chairing sessions of the House of Lords, is now back on display in the chamber. Copies of debates of the old Irish Parliament are now kept in Leinster House, keeping a direct link between the two eras.

Re-establishment of a Parliament in Dublin

From the 1830s under Daniel O'Connell, generations of leaders campaigned for the creation of a new Irish parliament, convinced that the Act of Union had been a great mistake. While O'Connell campaigned for full-scale repeal, leaders like Isaac Butt and Charles Stewart Parnell sought a more modest form of Home Rule within the United Kingdom, rather than an independent Irish state. Leaders from O'Connell to Parnell and later John Redmond spoke of the proud day on which an Irish parliament might once again meet in what they called Grattan's Parliament in College Green. When, in 1911, King George V and his consort Queen Mary visited Dublin (where they attracted mass crowds), street sellers sold drawings of the King and Queen arriving in the not too distant future at the Old Houses of Parliament in College Green.

Their advocacy resulted in several legislative attempts to re-establish an Irish Parliament. The first attempt in 1886 did not pass the British House of Commons, while the second in 1893 was blocked by the massive unionist majority in the British House of Lords. Finally, the passage of the Parliament Act in 1911, which restricted the veto powers of the House of Lords, created space in 1914 for an Irish Home Rule Bill to pass both Houses, receive the Royal Assent and become law.

However, the First World War injected what proved to be a fatal delay for Home Rule and in late April 1916, a small band of radical Republicans under Patrick Pearse staged the Easter Rising, in which they seized a number of prominent Irish buildings, mainly in Dublin, and proclaimed an Irish Republic. One building they did not take over was the old Parliament House. Perhaps they feared that, as a bank, it would be heavily protected. Perhaps, expecting that the Rising would ultimately fail and that the reaction to the Rising and what Pearse called their "blood sacrifice", rather than the Rising itself, would reawaken Irish nationalism and produce independence, they did not seek to use the building for fear that it, like the GPO, would be destroyed in the British counter-attack. Or perhaps, because of its association with a former Ascendancy parliament, it carried little symbolism for them. The rising eventually lead to the partitioning of Ireland and the establishment of the Irish Free State, which was a British Dominion rather than a form of Home Rule.

The Dáil

In January 1919, Irish republican MPs elected in the 1918 general election assembled to form the First Dáil and issued a Unilateral Declaration of Independence. They chose the Round Room of the Mansion House, the official residence of the Lord Mayor of Dublin for their home. (The Round Room had more royal connections than the old Parliament House; it had been built for the visit of King George IV in 1821.)

It is highly unlikely that the Bank of Ireland, then with a largely Unionist board (some of whom were directly descended from members of the former Irish Parliament), would have supplied the building for such a use. The building was also a working bank and headquarters. In 1921 the British Government created a House of Commons of Southern Ireland through the Government of Ireland Act 1920 (also known as the Fourth Home Rule Act), though only four MPs (all unionists) assembled for the State Opening of Parliament by the Lord Lieutenant, which was held in the Royal College of Science rather than the old Parliament House. Section 66 of the 1920 Act stated that once the Government of Southern Ireland had provided alternative accommodation for the bank and compensation for moving, the old Parliament House would become vested in "His Majesty for the use of the Parliament of Southern Ireland". However, the House of Commons of Southern Ireland failed to operate, no Government of Southern Ireland was ever formed, superseded by the Irish Free State.

In 1922, when the Provisional Government under W. T. Cosgrave made its plans for independence, it gave little thought to the old Parliament House. In addition to dealing with the bank, it lacked room around it for additional buildings to be used for governmental purposes. Directly behind it, was a major street called Fleet Street. In front of it, at both the Lords and Commons entrances, were major thoroughfares, College Green and Westmoreland Street, leaving the only space for expansion on its Foster Place side, which also had little space for offices. Finally, in the Ireland of 1922 with a civil war raging, the building was not secure enough to be used as a modern-day parliament.

As a result, the Free State initially hired Leinster House from its then owner, the Royal Dublin Society, in 1922, before buying it in 1924. Longer-term plans either to convert the Royal Hospital Kilmainham, into a national parliament, or to build a new parliament house, all fell through, leaving Leinster House as the accidental result.

Modern view

The house is seen generally with affection by Dubliners. It was used as a symbol by generations of nationalist leaders from O'Connell to Parnell and Redmond in their own quest for Irish self-government. In a particular irony, Sinn Féin, which as a republican party fought for Irish independence during the Anglo-Irish War, was founded by a man, Arthur Griffith, who sought to restore the King, Lords and Commons of Ireland and the 1782 constitution to the centre of Irish governance, and the College Green Houses of Parliament to its position as the home of an Irish parliament.

To this day some still lobby for the re-establishment of the College Green House of Parliament. In 2006, the Minister for Communications, Energy and Natural Resources, Eamon Ryan, met with Bank of Ireland's chief executive and chair to propose the building for an electronic library. In 2010, Minister of State, Seán Haughey, proposed that the building be handed over to the state in return for the Irish state's bailout of the bank during the Irish banking crisis. Both suggestions were rejected by the bank.

Other suggestions included that the building be used to house the bank's former art collection, that it be used as an office for an elected Lord Mayor of Dublin or that it house the Dáil or Seanad and act as a parliament building again. In 2011, Jimmy Deenihan, Minister for Arts, Heritage and the Gaeltacht, wrote to the bank setting out proposals to acquire the building as a venue for the state to use as a cultural venue and requesting a meeting with the bank's Governor. TD Kevin Humphreys in 2012 also called for the bank to return the building to the state.

References and sources

Notes

Sources

 
 

 History of the Irish Parliament 1692–1800 by E.M. Johnston-Liik (Ulster Historical Foundation, 2002) 
 Volume 2 of "The Unreformed House of Commons" by Edward and Annie G. Porritt (Cambridge University Press, 1903)

External links

1789 establishments in Ireland
Buildings and structures in Dublin (city)
Government buildings completed in 1789
Government buildings in the Republic of Ireland
Legislative buildings in Europe
Parliament of Ireland
Seats of national legislatures
Edward Lovett Pearce buildings